Malazan Book of the Fallen  is a series of epic fantasy novels written by the Canadian author Steven Erikson. The series, published  by Bantam Books in the U.K. and Tor Books in the U.S., consists of ten volumes, beginning with Gardens of the Moon (1999) and concluding with The Crippled God (2011). Erikson's series is extremely complex with a wide scope, and presents the narratives of a large cast of characters spanning thousands of years across multiple continents.

His plotting presents a complicated series of events in the world upon which the Malazan Empire is located. Each of the first five novels is relatively self-contained, in that each resolves its respective primary conflict; but many underlying characters and events are interwoven throughout the works of the series, binding it together. The Malazan world was co-created by Steven Erikson and Ian Cameron Esslemont in the early 1980s as a backdrop to their GURPS roleplaying campaign. In 2005, Esslemont began publishing his own series of six novels set in the same world, beginning with Night of Knives. Although Esslemont's books are published under a different series title – Novels of the Malazan Empire – Esslemont and Erikson collaborated on the storyline for the entire sixteen-book project and Esslemont's novels are considered to be as canonical and integral to the series' mythos as Erikson's own.

The series has received widespread critical acclaim, with reviewers praising the epic scope, plot complexity and characterizations, and fellow authors such as Glen Cook (The Black Company) and Stephen R. Donaldson (The Chronicles of Thomas Covenant) hailing it as a masterwork of the imagination, and comparing Erikson to the likes of Joseph Conrad, Henry James, William Faulkner, and Fyodor Dostoevsky.

Setting

Malazan world has no official unified name, although Steven Erikson has jokingly called it Wu. The name has gained traction among fans as an affectionate and informal term for the planet.

Malazan world is a globe and appears to be similar in size to Earth, and may be notably larger. No unified map of the entire planet has been published to date, although fans have frequently attempted to create one. According to Erikson, a world map may appear in the planned Encyclopaedia Malazica. He has also confirmed that rough sketches of such maps have already been created.

In an interview with a Spanish fantasy blog, Erikson said that the hand-drawn version of the Malazan world which he had at home was too large to be photocopied, however, that the maps created by fans were coming close.

The Malazan planet has at least four moons, although only one is easily visible from the surface and known to the general population.  Three other moons are perpetually occluded from the sun's light.  Early historical texts suggested they were not always so difficult to see.  Constellations visible from the world included the Roads of the Abyss and the Dagger.

Geography

There are at least six continents on the Malazan world according to Midnight Tides. However, Return of the Crimson Guard suggests twelve major landmasses exist. The definition of what constitutes a "continent", "subcontinent" or large island in the world has never been firmly defined.

The largest continent on the Malazan world has no overall name. This landmass's eastern region (comprising roughly one-third of the entire landmass) is known as Seven Cities. This region is separated from the rest of the landmass by the vast Jhag Odhan. To the west of this lies the kingdoms of Nemil and Perish, whilst to the south-west lies the substantial Shal-Morzinn Empire.

South of Seven Cities lies the Falari Isles and the small continent of Quon Tali. Quon Tali is the heartland of the Malazan Empire, which was born on an island just off its southern coast. The island of Drift Avalii is located some distance off its south-western coast.

The narrow Strait of Storms divides Malaz Island from the continent of Korelri. Korelri is a large landmass comprising two subcontinents, Fist and Stratem. Fist consists of a vast number of islands and a part of the adjacent landmass. The Aurgatt Range divides the lands of Fist from Stratem. Stratem consists of several peninsulas, divided from one another by a large inlet known as the Sea of Chimes.

South-west of Korelri and Quon Tali, beyond a vast field of floating ice, lies the small island-continent of Jacuruku. Jacuruku is a land of harsh extremes, with burning deserts on the western side and verdant jungle on the eastern.

East of Seven Cities and north-east of Quon Tali, across Seeker's Deep, lies the continent of Genabackis. Genabackis is a narrow but long continent stretching for many hundreds of leagues from north to south. To the east of Genabackis lies the Genostel Archipelago, comprising one large island (itself large enough to be counted as a subcontinent) and many smaller ones. Further east still is the Cabal Archipelago, which may lie closer to the far western coast of Seven Cities.

Due east of Quon Tali and south-east of Genabackis lies the continent of Assail. This is a long landmass comprising two distinct regions, Assail proper (which is regarded as a land of unrelenting hostility) and a more civilised peninsula area in the south, known as Bael.

East of Assail, south of western Seven Cities and south-west of Jacuruku, lies the large continent of Lether, named for its largest nation. Isolated from the rest of the world by distance and the immense ice fields near Jacuruku, Lether had little contact with other lands and nations prior to the arrival of the renegade Malazan 14th Army.

Books

The Kharkanas Trilogy

The Kharkanas Trilogy is a prequel series written by Steven Erikson after the completion of the main series. The series deals with the Tiste before their split into darkness, light and shadow. It sheds light on the events that are often hinted at in the background of Malazan Book of the Fallen. Many of the important Tiste characters from the Malazan Book of the Fallen make an appearance like Anomander Rake, Draconus, Spinnock Durav and Andarist.

Path to Ascendancy 
The Path to Ascendancy is a prequel series set in the world of Malazan, written by Ian Cameron Esslemont. The stories deal with the early adventures of Dancer and Kellanved (Dorin and Wu, in this series) and their eventual rise to power on Quon Tali.

Malazan Book of the Fallen
The main series written by Steven Erikson. The first book in the series, Gardens of the Moon, was shortlisted for a World Fantasy Award. The second novel, Deadhouse Gates, was voted one of the ten best fantasy novels of 2000 by SF Site. See the structure section below for more information.

Novels of the Malazan Empire
Six-part novel series set in the world of Malazan. It was written by Ian Cameron Esslemont. The novels cover events simultaneous with the Book of the Fallen, like the mystery of the Crimson Guard, the succession of the Malazan Empire, the situation on Korel and Jacuruku and the mystery of Assail. Some of these events are hinted at during the course of the Malazan Book of the Fallen. Characters that appear throughout the novels are Kyle, Greymane and the avowed members of the Crimson Guard like Shimmer, Blues, K'azz, Skinner and Cowl.

The Witness Trilogy
Planned trilogy written by Steven Erikson. It will be a sequel to the main series featuring Karsa Orlong and his quest to destroy civilization.

The Tales of Bauchelain and Korbal Broach (novellas)
The first three novellas were published together as The Tales of Bauchelain and Korbal Broach, Volume 1. The Tales of Bauchelain and Korbal Broach, Volume 2 includes the second three novellas. 
 Blood Follows (2002)
 The Healthy Dead (2004)
 The Lees of Laughter's End (2007)
Crack'd Pot Trail (2009)
The Wurms of Blearmouth (2012)
The Fiends of Nightmaria (2016)
Upon a Dark of Evil Overlords (2020)

Reading order
Erikson and Esslemont recommend reading the books in order of publication. Tor.com published a reading order based on the approximate chronological order of events in the series, which the authors did not consider suitable as a reading order for a first-time reader.
The publication order of the series is as follows:

Authorship

Conception

The Malazan world was originally created by Steven Erikson and Ian Cameron Esslemont in 1982 as a backdrop for role-playing games using a modified version of Advanced Dungeons & Dragons. By 1986, when the GURPS system had been adopted by Erikson and Esslemont, the world had become much larger and more complex, approaching its current scope. It was then developed into a movie script entitled Gardens of the Moon. When this was not successful in finding interest, the two writers agreed to each write a series set in their shared world. Steven Erikson wrote Gardens of the Moon as a novel in the period 1991-92 but it was not published until 1999. In the meantime, he wrote several non-fantasy novels. When he sold Gardens of the Moon, he agreed to a contract for an additional nine volumes in the series. The contract with Bantam UK was worth £675,000  making it "among the largest fees ever paid for a fantasy series".

Ian Cameron Esslemont's first published Malazan story, the novella Night of Knives, was released as a limited edition by PS Publishing in 2004 and as a mass-market hardcover by Bantam UK in 2007. The second novel, Return of the Crimson Guard, was published in 2008, with a limited PS Publishing edition preceding the larger-scale Bantam UK release. The third novel, Stonewielder, was released on 11 December 2010 in the UK by Bantam, and 11 May 2011 in the US by TOR. Orb Sceptre Throne and Blood and Bone, the fourth and fifth novels, were both published in 2012, and Assail, the sixth, was published in 2014.

After finishing the two main series, Erikson and Esslemont continued on to further projects in the Malazan universe. While writing the last novels in The Malazan Book of the Fallen, Erikson decided that his next project, The Kharkanas Trilogy, would be a "trilogy traditional in form," saying the following:"If the Malazan series emphasized a postmodern critique of the subgenre of epic fantasy, paying subtle homage all the while, the Kharkanas Trilogy subsumes the critical aspects and focuses instead on the homage."The first novel in the trilogy, Forge of Darkness, was released in 2012, and the second novel, Fall of Light, was released in April 2016. Information on the third novel, Walk in Shadow, is forthcoming. As for Esslemont, the first novel in his Path to Ascendancy trilogy, Dancer's Lament, was released in February 2016.

At one point, Steven Erikson indicated that the two authors would collaborate on The Encyclopedia Malaz, an extensive guide to the series, which was to be published following the last novel in the main sequence. In an interview on a later date, however, he mentioned talks underway with an RPG 20D group to produce a game adapted from the Malazan universe, in which case the maps and notes created by Erikson and Esslemont would be released through installments or expansions rather than through the publishing of an encyclopedia.

Structure
The series is not told in a linear fashion. Instead, several storylines progress simultaneously, with the individual novels moving backwards and forwards between them. As the series progresses, links between these storylines become more readily apparent. During a book signing in November 2005, Steven Erikson confirmed that the Malazan saga consists of three major story arcs, equating them to the points of a triangle.

The first plotline takes place on the continent of Genabackis where armies of the Malazan Empire are battling the native city-states for dominance. An elite Malazan military unit, the Bridgeburners, is the focus for this storyline, although as it proceeds their erstwhile enemies, the Tiste Andii led by Anomander Rake and the mercenaries commanded by Warlord Caladan Brood, also become prominent. The novel Gardens of the Moon depicts an attempt by the Malazans to seize control of the city of Darujhistan. Memories of Ice, the third novel released in the sequence, continues the unresolved plot threads from Gardens of the Moon by having the now-outlawed Malazan armies uniting with their former enemies to confront a new, mutual threat known as the Pannion Domin. Toll the Hounds, the eighth novel in the series, revisits Genabackis some years later as new threats arise to Darujhistan and the Tiste Andii who now control the city of Black Coral.

The second plotline takes place on the subcontinent of Seven Cities and depicts a major native uprising against Malazan rule. This rebellion is known as 'the Whirlwind'. The second novel released in the sequence, Deadhouse Gates, shows the outbreak of this rebellion and focuses on the rebels' relentless pursuit of the main Malazan army as it escorts some 40,000 refugees more than 1,500 miles (2,400 km) across the continent. The story of the pursuit, and the event itself, is referred to as the Chain of Dogs. The fourth novel, House of Chains, sees the continuation of this storyline with newly arrived Malazan reinforcements – the 14th Army – taking the war to the rebels. The 14th's exploits earn them the nickname, 'The Bonehunters'.

The third plotline was introduced with Midnight Tides, the fifth book released in the series. This novel introduces a previously unknown continent where two nations, the united tribes of the Tiste Edur and the Empire of Lether, are engaged in escalating tensions, which culminate in open warfare. The novel takes place contemporaneously with earlier books in the sequence and the events in it are in fact being related in flashback by a character from the fourth volume to one of his comrades (although the novel itself is told in the traditional third-person form).

The sixth book, The Bonehunters, sees all three plot strands combined, with the now-reconciled Malazan army from Genabackis arriving in Seven Cities to aid in the final defeat of the rebellion. At the same time, fleets from the newly proclaimed Letherii Empire are scouring the globe for worthy champions to face their immortal emperor in battle, in the process earning the enmity of elements of the Malazan Empire. The seventh novel, Reaper's Gale, sees the Malazan 14th Army arriving in Lether to take the battle to the Letherii homeland. The ninth and tenth novels, Dust of Dreams and The Crippled God, picks up the storyline on the Lether continent and deal with the activities of the 14th Army following their successful 'liberation' of the Letherii people and the revelation that the K'Chain Che'Malle species and Forkrul Assail species have returned. The 14th Army is attempting to deal with the peril that the Crippled God has caused with his attempts to poison the warrens and to wake Burn.

Ian Cameron Esslemont's novels are labeled as Novels of the Malazan Empire, not as parts of the Malazan Book of the Fallen itself, and deal primarily with the Malazan Empire, its internal politics and characters who only play minor roles in Erikson's novels. His first novel, Night of Knives, details events in Malaz City on the night that the Emperor Kellanved was assassinated. The second, Return of the Crimson Guard, investigates the fall-out in the Malazan Empire from the devastating losses of the Genabackan, Korelri and Seven Cities campaigns following the events of The Bonehunters. Esslemont's third novel, Stonewielder, explores events on the Korelri continent for the first time in the series and focuses on the often-mentioned, rarely seen character of Greymane. The fourth novel, Orb Sceptre Throne, revisits Genebackis once again in the wake of Erikson's Toll the Hounds, and features several well known characters seen in Erikson's novels. Esslemont's fifth novel, Blood and Bone visits the continent of Jacuruku and the sixth, Assail, set on the continent of Assail, serves as a closing chapter and coda for the entire series.

Influences

In a general review of The Cambridge Companion to Fantasy Literature, edited by Edward James and Farah Mendlesohn, Erikson fired a shot across the bow of "the state of scholarship in the fantastic as it pertains to epic fantasy," taking particularly to task James's opening lines in Chapter 5 of that volume. Erikson uses a handful of words from that chapter as an epigraph for a quasi-autobiographical essay in The New York Review of Science Fiction. James's sentences read in full:

Erikson writes, "But epic fantasy has moved on, something critics have failed to notice." He goes on,

Erikson concludes, "So, Professor James, when you say 'since [Tolkien and The Lord of the Rings]... most subsequent writers of fantasy are either imitating him or else desperately trying to escape his influence'—sorry. You're flat-out wrong."

Themes
The Malazan series contains many themes around socio-economic inequality and social injustice throughout such as gender equality with Erikson stating "It occurred to us that it would create a culture without gender bias so there would be no gender-based hierarchies of power. It became a world without sexism and that was very interesting to explore." as well as the inevitability of and role of art in civilizational collapse and many other themes rooted in a postmodernist and post-structuralist deconstruction of the fantasy genre and magical realism.

Characters of the Malazan Book of the Fallen

Magic
Magic in the Malazan series is accomplished by tapping the power of a Warren or Hold, from within the body of the mage. Effects common to most warrens include enchantment of objects (investment), minor healing, large-scale blasts and travel through warren across great distances in a short period of time. Other effects are more specific to each warren. For example, Thyr is the warren of light, Telas is the warren of fire, Serc is the warren of Air, and Denul is the warren of healing. The specific uses of this power can vary depending on the ingenuity of the user. Only a minority of humans can access warrens, usually tapping and working with a single one, with High Mages accessing two or three. Two notable exceptions to this are the High Mage Quick Ben who can access seven at any single time out of his repertoire of twelve (due to his killing of and subsequent merging with the souls of eleven other sorcerers), and Beak who can access all the warrens (although he seems to have a cognitive disability). Certain Elder races have access to warrens specific to their race which seem to be significantly more powerful and cannot be blocked by the magic-deadening ore otataral. Examples of this phenomenon are Tellann, representing fire, for the T'lan Imass, and Omtose Phellack, representing ice, for the Jaghut. Further, three aspects of Kurald for each of the Tiste races: Kurald Galain, representing Dark, for the Tiste Andii; Kurald Emurlahn, representing Shadow, for the Tiste Edur; and Kurald Thyrllan, representing Light, for the Tiste Liosan.

Alternatively, a more basic form of magic can be harnessed by using or capturing natural spirits of the land, elements, people, or animals. A form of this method is also utilized when the power of an ascendant or god is called upon or channeled, although in most cases this is also linked with the warren of that being.

Soletaken and D'ivers 
Some characters within the Malazan series are able to veer into animal form (shapeshifting). Characters which veer into a single animal are called Soletaken. Examples of Soletaken include Anomander Rake, the Son of Darkness (dragon) and Treach/Trake, a god of war (tiger). D'ivers can veer into a pack of animals. Prominent examples of D'ivers include Gryllen (rats, also known as the Tide of Madness) and Mogora (spiders).

Cards and Tiles
Cards are from the Deck of Dragons while the elder Tiles belong to the Tiles of the Hold. They are similar in that they are used to get information about present and future events. They are used separately on two different continents and both are not known about contiguously except by very rare people such as Bottle, a squad mage in Tavore's 14th Army. Houses (Deck of Dragons) and Holds (Tiles of the Hold) usually relate to Warrens (Deck) and Holds (Tiles). The difference between these two is marked by the progressive evolution of magic. As magic evolves, Tiles and Cards become active or inactive. Usually the two do not overlap, except in a few instances where elder realms have become active (the Beast Hold, mentioned in Memories of Ice and Midnight Tides).

Deck of Dragons
The Deck of Dragons resembles a Tarot card deck in that it consists of cards that divine the future. The difference is that a real Deck of Dragons adjusts itself to the changing circumstances of the pantheon. If an entity ascends or dies, the deck will change to reflect this fact. The pictures on the cards reflect the gods/ascendants that each is made to represent.  Not all cards are active on all continents; for example, Obelisk is referred to as inactive on Seven Cities until partway through Deadhouse Gates.

Tiles of the Hold
As an alternative and older version of the Deck of Dragons, the Tiles of the Holds are also used for divination. Their use is restricted to the continent of Lether, where the influence of the Jaghut warren Omtose Phellack halted the evolution of magic in a less developed state. The Tiles of the Hold are cast rather than read.

Critical reception
The series was positively received by critics, who praised the epic scope, plot complexity and the introspective nature of the characterization, which serve as social commentary. Fellow author Glen Cook has called the series a masterwork of the imagination that may be the high water mark of the epic fantasy genre. In his treatise written for The New York Review of Science Fiction, fellow author Stephen R. Donaldson has also praised Erikson for his approach to the fantasy genre, the subversion of classical tropes, the complex characterizations, the social commentary — pointing explicitly to parallels between the fictional Letheras Economy and the US Economy — and has compared him to the likes of Joseph Conrad, Henry James, William Faulkner, and Fyodor Dostoevsky.

Reviewing for SF Site, Dominic Cilli says, The Malazan Book of the Fallen raises "the bar for fantasy literature", that the world building and the writing are exceptional. Cilli claims the series is written for the "most advanced readers out there.", going on to state that "Even they will have to make two passes through all ten books to fully comprehend the myriad of plotlines, characters and various settings that Erickson presents to us." Reading Erikson's "The Malazan Book of the Fallen" might be "the most challenging literary trial" a reader has ever tried, yet  "the payoff is too enormous to ignore and well worth taking on the endeavor. Steven Erikson doesn't spoon feed his readers. He forces you to question and think on a level that very few authors would even dare for fear of finding and perhaps losing an audience."

Footnotes

References

External links
 
 

Book series introduced in 1999
 
Fantasy books by series
Novels by Steven Erikson
High fantasy novels